United Nations Security Council resolution 1628, adopted unanimously on 30 September 2005, after recalling all previous resolutions on the situation in the Democratic Republic of the Congo, including resolutions 1565 (2004), 1592 (2005), 1596 (2005) and 1621 (2005), the Council extended the mandate of the United Nations Mission in the Democratic Republic of Congo (MONUC) for a period of one month.

The Council reaffirmed its support for the sovereignty, territorial integrity and independence of the Democratic Republic of the Congo and extended the mandate of MONUC until 31 October 2005. The resolution was essentially technical in nature to allow the Council more time to discuss a one-year extension of the mission proposed by the Secretary-General Kofi Annan.

See also
 Kivu conflict
 Ituri conflict
 List of United Nations Security Council Resolutions 1601 to 1700 (2005–2006)
 Second Congo War

References

External links
 
Text of the Resolution at undocs.org

 1628
2005 in the Democratic Republic of the Congo
 1628
September 2005 events